Martin Louis Alan Gompertz (February 23, 1886 – September 29, 1951) was a British soldier and writer, born in India, also known by the pseudonym of 'Ganpat', which was the nearest his Indian troops could get to pronouncing 'Gompertz'. Ganpat is another name for the elephant god Ganesh. He started his writing career with articles for 'Blackwood's Magazine' on his service in East Africa during World War 1. He wrote many adventure stories in the style of H. Rider Haggard, though most of Ganpat's stories are set in the Himalayas. He was an Anglo Indian soldier, and his stories reflect his military and frontier background. He retired in 1939 with the rank of Brigadier, ending his days in the town of Chagford, on the edge of Dartmoor, where he could pursue his passion for fishing.

Works

His books include the following titles:

Dainra 
Fairy Silver
Harilek 
High Snow
The Marches of Honour
Mirror of Dreams
The One-Eyed Knave
Out of Evil
Roads of Peace 
The Second Tigress 
Seven Times Proven 
The Sleepy Duke (Historical Novel of the Plantaganets) 
The Snow Falcon 
Snow Rubies
The Speakers In Silence
Stella Nash
The Three R's (Science Fiction)
The Voice Of Dashin
Walls Have Eyes.(Science Fiction)
The War Breakers
Wrexham's Romance

He also wrote two travel books on Ladakh, the Tibetan enclave in North-West Kashmir, "The Road to Lamaland" and "Magic Ladakh", as well as a travel brochure titled, "The North-West Frontier of India" for the Indian State Railways.  Having served as a Captain in the 108th Infantry of the British Indian Army, Gompertz also wrote, "The Indian Army Quartermaster's Manual", published in 1914.

References
The Book and Magazine Collector, No. 210, September 2001. ASIN: B002D2TUQ8

External links
 
 Ganpat at the Encyclopedia of Fantasy

1886 births
1951 deaths
20th-century British writers
British people in colonial India